Tsimlyansk is a town and the administrative center of Tsimlyansky District in Rostov Oblast, Russia, located on the right bank of the Don River, on the coast of Tsimlyansk Reservoir,  northeast of Rostov-on-Don, the administrative center of the oblast. Population:

History
It was founded in 1672 by the Don Cossacks as Ust-Tsimla. Until 1950, it was known as the stanitsa of Tsimlyanskaya. It was granted town status in 1961.

Administrative and municipal status
Within the framework of administrative divisions, Tsimlyansk serves as the administrative center of Tsimlyansky District. As an administrative division, it is incorporated within Tsimlyansky District as Tsimlyanskoye Urban Settlement. As a municipal division, this administrative unit also has urban settlement status and is a part of Tsimlyansky Municipal District.

Climate

References

Notes

Sources

Cities and towns in Rostov Oblast
Don Host Oblast
Populated places established in 1672
1672 establishments in Russia